Diary of a Whimsical Lover is a contemporary romance novel written by Gaurav Sharma. The book is primarily set in Vancouver, Canada and is centered around the theme of unrequited love. It is Sharma's first romance novel.

Publication
The first edition of Diary of a Whimsical Lover was published in July 2022 by Think Tank Books, a Delhi-based publishing house.

Synopsis
Diary of a Whimsical Lover is a story about Gaurav and Maya, two young professionals in Vancouver who must overcome many challenges to be together. Both develop an immediate connection when they meet for the first time at a party. Gaurav is mesmerized by Maya's beauty and charm, while she appreciates Gaurav's distinct sense of humour and compassionate temperament. The protagonist is an introverted Indian author who moved to Canada. Maya, on the other hand, is charming, endearing, and very well liked. The story uses first person narration.

Reception
 News 24 Online said the book "will take you on a roller coaster ride of love and friendship"
 The Andaman Chronicle commented "Diary of a Whimsical Lover moves along at its own pace, shunning the readers' interpretations—it is neither tragic nor intense, yet a riveting read"

Main characters
 Gaurav (as himself)
 Maya
 Lalita
 Kev
 Mrs. Caul

References

Indian English-language novels
Canadian romance novels
Novels set in Vancouver
Young adult books
Novels based on actual events
2022 Canadian novels
Contemporary romance novels
Asian-Canadian literature